Neqab (also Romanized as Neqāb) is a city and capital of Joveyn County, in Razavi Khorasan Province, Iran. At the 2006 census, its population was 12,022, in 3,087 families.

References 

Populated places in Joveyn County
Cities in Razavi Khorasan Province